Appellate Jurisdiction Act is a stock short title used for legislation in the United Kingdom which relates to the jurisdiction of appellate courts.

List
The Appellate Jurisdiction Act 1876 (39 & 40 Vict. c. 59)
The Appellate Jurisdiction Act 1887 (50 & 51 Vict. c. 70)
The Appellate Jurisdiction Act 1908 (8 Edw. 7 c. 51)
The Appellate Jurisdiction Act 1913 (3 & 4 Geo. 5 c. 21)
The Appellate Jurisdiction Act 1929 (19 & 20 Geo. 5 c. 8)
The Appellate Jurisdiction Act 1947 (10 & 11 Geo. 6 c. 11)

See also
List of short titles
Judicature Act
Supreme Court of Judicature Act

Lists of legislation by short title
Law of the United Kingdom